Netlink is a socket family used for inter-process communication (IPC) between both the kernel and userspace processes, and between different userspace processes, in a way similar to the Unix domain sockets available on certain Unix-like operating systems, including its original incarnation as a Linux kernel interface, as well as in the form of a later implementation on FreeBSD. Similarly to the Unix domain sockets, and unlike INET sockets, Netlink communication cannot traverse host boundaries. However, while the Unix domain sockets use the file system namespace, Netlink sockets are usually addressed by process identifiers (PIDs).

Netlink is designed and used for transferring miscellaneous networking information between the kernel space and userspace processes. Networking utilities, such as the iproute2 family and the utilities used for configuring mac80211-based wireless drivers, use Netlink to communicate with the Linux kernel from userspace. Netlink provides a standard socket-based interface for userspace processes, and a kernel-side API for internal use by kernel modules. Originally, Netlink used the socket family.

Netlink is designed to be a more flexible successor to ioctl; RFC 3549 describes the protocol in detail.

History
Netlink was created by Alexey Kuznetsov as a more flexible alternative to the sophisticated but awkward  communication method used for setting and getting external socket options. The Linux kernel continues to support  for backward compatibility.

Netlink was first provided in the 2.0 series of the Linux kernel, implemented as a character device. The Netlink socket interface appeared in 2.2 series of the Linux kernel.

In 2022, experimental support for the Netlink protocol was added to FreeBSD. Initially, only a subset of the NETLINK_ROUTE family and NETLINK_GENERIC is supported.

Packet structure

Unlike BSD sockets using Internet protocols such as TCP, where the message headers are autogenerated, the Netlink message header (available as ) must be prepared by the caller. The Netlink socket generally works in a -like mode, even if  was used to create it.

The data portion then contains a subsystem-specific message that may be further nested.

Netlink socket families
The  family offers multiple protocol subsets. Each interfaces to a different kernel component and has a different messaging subset. The subset is referenced by the protocol field in the socket call:

 int socket(AF_NETLINK, SOCK_DGRAM or SOCK_RAW, protocol)

Some sources state that both options are legitimate, and the reference below from Red Hat states that  is always the parameter. However, iproute2 uses both interchangeably.

Netlink protocols
A non-exhaustive list of the supported protocol entries follows:

 NETLINK_ROUTE
 provides routing and link information. This information is used primarily for user-space routing daemons. Linux implements a large subset of messages:
 Link layer: RTM_NEWLINK, RTM_DELLINK, RTM_GETLINK, RTM_SETLINK
 Address settings: RTM_NEWADDR, RTM_DELADDR, RTM_GETADDR
 Routing tables: RTM_NEWROUTE, RTM_DELROUTE, RTM_GETROUTE
 Neighbor cache: RTM_NEWNEIGH, RTM_DELNEIGH, RTM_GETNEIGH
 Routing rules: RTM_NEWRULE, RTM_DELRULE, RTM_GETRULE
 Queuing discipline settings: RTM_NEWQDISC, RTM_DELQDISC, RTM_GETQDISC
 Traffic classes used with queues: RTM_NEWTCLASS, RTM_DELTCLASS, RTM_GETTCLASS
 Traffic filters: RTM_NEWTFILTER, RTM_DELTFILTER, RTM_GETTFILTER
 Others: RTM_NEWACTION, RTM_DELACTION, RTM_GETACTION, RTM_NEWPREFIX, RTM_GETPREFIX, RTM_GETMULTICAST, RTM_GETANYCAST, RTM_NEWNEIGHTBL, RTM_GETNEIGHTBL, RTM_SETNEIGHTBL

 NETLINK_FIREWALL
 provides an interface for a user-space app to receive packets from the firewall.

 NETLINK_NFLOG
 provides an interface used to communicate between Netfilter and iptables.

 NETLINK_ARPD
 provides an interface to manage the ARP table from user-space.

 NETLINK_AUDIT
 provides an interface to the audit subsystem found in Linux kernel versions 2.6.6 and later.

 NETLINK_IP6_FW
 provides an interface to transport packets from netfilter to user-space.

 NETLINK_ROUTE6

 NETLINK_TAPBASE

 NETLINK_NETFILTER

 NETLINK_TCPDIAG

 NETLINK_XFRM
 provides an interface to manage the IPsec security association and security policy databases - mostly used by key-manager daemons using the Internet Key Exchange protocol.

 NETLINK_KOBJECT_UEVENT
 provides the interface in which the kernel broadcasts uevents, typically consumed by udev.

 NETLINK_GENERIC
One of the drawbacks of the Netlink protocol is that the number of protocol families is limited to 32.This is one of the main reasons that the generic Netlink family was created—to provide support for adding a higher number of families. It acts as a Netlink multiplexer and works with a single Netlink family . The generic Netlink protocol is based on the Netlink protocol and uses its API.

User-defined Netlink protocol
Users can add a Netlink handler in their own kernel routines. This allows the development of additional Netlink protocols to address new kernel modules.

See also

 Comparison of open-source wireless drivers – mac80211-based drivers rely on Netlink as the API to user space
 POSIX

References

External links
 Pablo Neira Ayuso, Rafael M. Gasca, Laurent Lefèvre. Communicating between the kernel and user-space in Linux using Netlink sockets. Software: Practice and Experience, 40(9):797-810, August 2010
 Why and How to Use Netlink Sockets
 RFC 3549
 netfilter/iptables project homepage - The netfilter.org "libmnl" project – Minimalist Library for Netlink – userspace library for construction and parsing of Netlink messages
 libnl - Netlink Protocol Library Suite – Netlink Protocol Library Suite – full functional library covering almost all aspects of working with Netlink sockets
 Manipulating the Networking Environment Using RTNETLINK
 Netlink Sockets – An Overview
 Netlink Protocol Library Suite
 "Linux Kernel Networking" by Rami Rosen, Apress 2013: Chapter 2, Netlink Sockets

Interfaces of the Linux kernel
Linux kernel features